Mursi (also Dama, Merdu, Meritu, Murzi, Murzu) is a Southeast Surmic language spoken by the Mursi people who live in the South Omo Zone on the eastern side of the lower Omo valley in southwest Ethiopia. The language is similar to Suri, another Southeast Surmic language spoken to the west of the Mursi language area. It is spoken by approximately 7,400 people.

Classification
Mursi is classified as belonging to the Southeast Surmic languages, to which the following other languages also belong: Suri, Me'en and Kwegu. As such, Mursi is also part of the superordinate Eastern Sudanic family of the Nilo-Saharan languages.

Phonology

Phoneme inventory
The vowel and consonant inventory of Mursi is similar to those of other Southeast Surmic languages, except for the lack of ejectives, the labial fricative // and the voiceless stop //.

Except for the hesitant inclusion of the glottal stop /ʔ/ by Firew, both Mütze and Firew agree on the consonant inventory. The layout mostly follows Mütze. The characters in angled brackets are the ones used by Firew, where they differ from Mütze.
Mütze rejects the phonemic status of the glottal stop [], claiming that it is phonetically inserted to break up vowel sequences. Firew discusses this and leaves the question undecided, but includes the sound in the phoneme chart.
Firew classifies the alveolar implosive // as postalveolar, without giving reasons.

Both Mütze and Firew agree on the vowel inventory and on the chosen transcription, as shown above.
Even though vowel length appears phonetically in Mursi, it can be explained by the elision of weak consonants between identical vowels.

Tone
Both Mütze and Firew agree that there are only two underlying tone levels in Mursi, as opposed to larger inventories proposed by Turton and Bender and Moges.

Grammar
The Mursi grammar makes use of the following parts of speech: nouns, verbs, adjectives, pronouns, adverbs, adpositions, question words, quantifiers, connectors, discourse particles, interjections, ideophones, and expressives.

Nouns
Nouns can be inflected for number and case. The number marking system is very complex, using suffixation, suppletion or tone to either mark plurals from singular bases, or singulatives from plural bases.
Mursi preverbal subjects and all objects are unmarked, whereas postverbal subjects are marked by a nominative case. Further cases are the oblique case and the genitive case.
Modified nouns receive a special morphological marking called construct form by Mütze.

Notes

Bibliography

External links
Mursi Online, University of Oxford
Mursi basic lexicon at the Global Lexicostatistical Database
World Atlas of Language Structures information on Mursi

Languages of Ethiopia
Surmic languages